"Thank You NHS" was a social phenomenon in the United Kingdom during 2020 and 2021, for part of the COVID-19 pandemic, whereby people and organisations posted messages of support for members of the National Health Service and other key workers, to acknowledge their heavy workload as well as their risk of infection.

Large numbers of private individuals placed home-made signs in their windows and outside their homes to thank the NHS workers. The handmade posters frequently featured drawings of rainbows.

The campaign was supported by the Conservative Party-controlled British government, which displayed children's "Thank You NHS" signs in the windows of 10 Downing Street. Organizations also supporting the campaign included the British Labour Party and Hull City Council. Other sponsors included sports teams such as Hibernian F.C. and the Premier League.

Some media outlets released poster artwork for people to print and display.

Gallery

See also 

 Clap for Our Carers

References 

COVID-19 pandemic in the United Kingdom
National responses to the COVID-19 pandemic
March 2020 events in the United Kingdom
April 2020 events in the United Kingdom
May 2020 events in the United Kingdom
National Health Service
Social movements in the United Kingdom
2020 in the United Kingdom
Social impact of the COVID-19 pandemic